

K

Ka 

 
 

 
 
 

Kaatialaite (IMA1982-021) 8.CC.10    (IUPAC: iron(III) tri(dihydroxoarsenate) trihydrate)
Kabalovite (IMA2021-117)
Kadyrelite (IMA1986-042) 3.DD.05    (IUPAC: tri(dimercury) oxo hydrotriborate)
Kaersutite [O-dominant amphibole: IMA2012 s.p., IMA1997 s.p.] 9.DE.15   
Kahlenbergite (magnetoferrite: IMA2018-158) 4.0  [no] [no]
Kahlerite (Y: 1953) 8.EB.05    (IUPAC: iron(II) diuranyl diarsenate dodecahydrate)
Kainite (Y: 1865) 7.DF.10    (IUPAC: potassium magnesium chloro sulfate trihydrate)
Kainosite-(Y) (IMA1987 s.p., 1886) 9.CF.10    (IUPAC: dicalcium diyttrium tetra(trioxysilicate) carbonate monohydrate)
Kainotropite (IMA2015-053) 8.0  [no] [no] (IUPAC: tetracopper iron(III) dioxide heptaoxodivanadate tetraoxovanadate)
Kaitianite (IMA2017-078a) 4.0  [no] [no]
Kalborsite (zeolitic tectosilicate: IMA1979-033) 9.GA.15   
Kalgoorlieite (IMA2015-119) 2.0  [no] [no] (IUPAC: diarsenic tritelluride)
Kaliborite (Y: 1889) 6.FB.10   
Kalicinite (Y: 1868) 5.AA.20    (IUPAC: potassium hydrogen carbonate)
Kalifersite (IMA1996-007) 9.EE.25   [no] [no]
Kalininite (spinel, linnaeite: IMA1984-028) 2.DA.05    (IUPAC: zinc dichromium tetrasulfide) 
KaliniteQ (Y: 1868) 7.CC.15    (IUPAC: potassium aluminium disulfate undecahydrate) Note: possibly alum-(K).
Kaliochalcite (tsumcorite: IMA2013-037) 7.0  [no] [no] (IUPAC: potassium dicopper disulfate [(hydro)(water)])
Kaliophilite (feldspathoid, nepheline: 1887) 9.FA.05    (IUPAC: potassium aluminium tetraoxysilicate)
Kalistrontite (palmierite: IMA1967 s.p., 1962) 7.AD.40    (IUPAC: dipotassium strontium disulfate)
Kalithallite (IMA2017-044) 3.0  [no] [no] (IUPAC: tripotassium hexachlorothallate(III) dihydrate)
Kalsilite (feldspathoid, nepheline: 1942) 9.FA.05    (IUPAC: potassium aluminium tetraoxysilicate)
Kalungaite (ullmannite: IMA2004-047) 2.EB.25    (IUPAC: palladium arsenide selenide)
(Kamacite: iron variety, 1.AE.05, α-(iron,nickel) alloy)
Kamaishilite (IMA1980-052) 9.FB.10    (IUPAC: dicalcium dihydro hexaoxy dialuminosilicate)
Kamarizaite (IMA2008-017) 8.0   [no] (IUPAC: triiron(III) trihydro diarsenate trihydrate)
Kambaldaite (IMA1982-098) 5.DA.20    (IUPAC: sodium tetranickel trihydro tricarbonate trihydrate)
Kamchatkite (IMA1987-018) 7.BC.35    (IUPAC: potassium tricopper chloro oxodisulfate)
Kamenevite (IMA2017-021) 9.DG.  [no] [no] (IUPAC: potassium titanium nonaoxytrisilicate monohydrate)
Kamiokite (nolanite: IMA1975-003) 4.CB.40    (IUPAC: diiron(II) trimolybdenum(IV) octaoxide)
Kamitugaite (IMA1983-030) 8.ED.15   
Kamotoite-(Y) (IMA1985-051) 5.EA.30    (IUPAC: diyttrium tetrauranyl tetraoxo tricarbonate tetradecahydrate)
Kampelite (IMA2016-084) 8.0  [no] [no]
Kampfite (IMA2000-003) 9.EG.20   
Kamphaugite-(Y) (IMA1987-043) 5.DC.10    (IUPAC: calcium yttrium hydro dicarbonate monohydrate)
Kanemite (IMA1971-050) 9.EF.25    (IUPAC: hydrogen sodium pentaoxydisilicate trihydrate)
Kangite (bixbyite: IMA2011-092) 4.0  [no] [no]
Kangjinlaite (silicide: IMA2019-112b)  [no] [no] (IUPAC: undecatitanium decasilicide)
Kaňkite (IMA1975-005) 8.CE.60    (IUPAC: diiron(III) diarsenate heptahydrate) 
Kannanite (ardennite: IMA2015-100) 9.BJ.  [no] [no]
Kanoite (pyroxene: IMA1977-020) 9.DA.10    (IUPAC: manganese magnesium hexaoxydisilicate)
Kanonaite (andalusite: IMA1976-047) 9.AF.10    (IUPAC: manganese(III) aluminium oxy tetraoxysilicate)
Kanonerovite (IMA1997-016) 8.FC.30    (IUPAC: trisodium manganese decaoxotriphosphate dodecahydrate)
Kaolinite (kaolinite: IMA1980 s.p., old) 9.ED.05    (IUPAC: aluminium pentaoxydisilicate tetrahydroxyl)
Kapellasite (atacamite: IMA2005-009) 3.DA.10c   [no] (IUPAC: tricopper zinc hexahydroxide dichloride)
Kapitsaite-(Y) (hyalotekite: IMA1998-057) 9.CH.05   [no] (Ba4Y2Si8B4O28F)
Kapundaite (IMA2009-047) 8.0  [no] [no] (IUPAC: sodium calcium tetrairon(III) trihydro tetraphosphate pentahydrate)
Kapustinite (lovozerite: IMA2003-018) 9.CJ.15a   
Karasugite (IMA1993-013) 3.CB.30    (IUPAC: strontium calcium heptafluoroaluminate)
Karchevskyite (hydrotalcite: IMA2005-015a) 5.DA.   
Karelianite (corundum: IMA1967 s.p., 1963) 4.CB.05    (IUPAC: divanadium trioxide)
Karenwebberite (olivine: IMA2011-015) 8.AB.10  [no] [no] (IUPAC: sodium (iron(II),manganese(II)) phosphate)
Karibibite (IMA1973-007) 4.JA.15    (IUPAC: diiron(III) hydro tetra(dioxoarsenate(III)) pentaoxodiarsenate(III))
Karlditmarite (IMA2021-003)  [no] [no]
Karlite (IMA1980-030) 6.AB.25   
Karnasurtite-(Ce)Q (IMA1987 s.p., 1959) 9.BE.70   
Karpenkoite (volborthite: IMA2014-092) 8.0  [no] [no] (IUPAC: tricobalt dihydro heptaoxodivanadate dihydrate)
KarpinskiteQ (corrensite: 1957) 9.EC.60    Note: possibly a Ni-rich antigorite or a Ni-rich interstratification of a talc-group mineral and a chlorite-group mineral.
Karpovite (IMA2013-040) 7.0  [no] [no] (IUPAC: dithallium vanadium oxodisulfate water)
Karupmøllerite-Ca (labuntsovite: IMA2001-028) 9.CE.30c   [no]
Kasatkinite (IMA2011-045) 9.0  [no]  (Ba2Ca8B5Si8O32(OH)3·6H2O)
Kashinite (IMA1982-036) 2.DB.15    (IUPAC: diiridium trisulfide)
Kaskasite (valleriite: IMA2013-025) 4.0  [no] 
Kasolite (IMA1980 s.p., 1921) 9.AK.15    (IUPAC: lead uranyl tetrasilicate monohydrate)
Kassite (IMA1968 s.p., 1965) 4.DH.10    (IUPAC: calcium dititanium dihydro tetraoxide)
Kastningite (stewardite, laueite: IMA1997-033) 8.DC.30    (IUPAC: manganese(II) dialuminium dihydro diphosphate octahydrate)
Katayamalite (baratovite: IMA1982-004) 9.CJ.25   [no]
Katerinopoulosite (picromerite: IMA2017-004) 7.0  [no] [no] (IUPAC: diammonium zinc disulfate hexahydrate)
Katiarsite (IMA2014-025) 8.0  [no] [no] (IUPAC: potassium titanium oxoarsenate)
Katoite (garnet: IMA1982-080a) 9.AD.25    (IUPAC: tricalcium dialuminium dodecahydroxide)
Katophorite [Na-Ca-amphibole: IMA2013-140, IMA2012 s.p., magnesiokatophorite (IMA1997 s.p.), katoforit (1894)] 9.DE.20   
Katoptrite (Y: 1917) 9.AE.40    (IUPAC: tridecamanganese(II) tetraluminium diantimony(V) icosaoxy ditetraoxysilicate)
Katsarosite (humboldtine: IMA2020-014)  [no] [no]
Kawazulite (tetradymite: IMA1968-014) 2.DC.05    (IUPAC: dibismuth ditelluride selenide)
Kayrobertsonite (IMA2015-029) 8.0  [no] [no] (IUPAC: manganese dialuminium dihydro diphosphate hexahydrate)
Kayupovaite (IMA2022-045)
Kazakhstanite (IMA1988-044) 8.CB.45   
Kazakovite (lovozerite: IMA1973-061) 9.CJ.15a    (IUPAC: hexasodium manganese(II) titanium octadecaoxyhexasilicate)
Kazanskyite (seidozerite, lamprophyllite: IMA2011-007) 9.B?.  [no] 
Kaznakhtite (hydrotalcite: IMA2021-056) [no] [no] [no]

Ke – Kl 
Keckite (whiteite: IMA1977-028) 8.DH.15   
Kegelite (IMA1974-042 Rd) 9.EC.80   
Kegginite (polyoxometalate: IMA2015-114) 8.0  [no] [no]
Keilite (galena, rocksalt: IMA2001-053) 2.CD.10    (IUPAC: iron sulfide)
Keithconnite (IMA1978-032) 2.BC.20    (IUPAC: icosalead heptatelluride)
Keiviite (thortveitite) 9.BC.05 (IUPAC: diREE heptaoxodisilicate)
Keiviite-(Y) (IMA1984-054) 9.BC.05   
Keiviite-(Yb) (IMA1982-065) 9.BC.05   
Keldyshite (IMA1975-034) 9.BC.10    (IUPAC: disodium zirconium heptaoxodisilicate)
Kellyite (serpentine: IMA1974-002) 9.ED.15   
Kelyanite (IMA1981-013) 3.DD.60    (IUPAC: dodecamercury antimony hexaoxide bromide dichloride)
Kemmlitzite (alunite, beudandite: IMA1967-021) 8.BL.05    (IUPAC: strontium trialuminium arsenate hexahydro sulfate)
Kempite (atacamite: 1924) 3.DA.10a    (IUPAC: dimanganese(II) chloride trihydroxide)
Kenhsuite (IMA1996-026) 2.FC.15b    (IUPAC: trimercury dichloro disulfide)
Kenngottite (IMA2018-063a) 8.0  [no] [no]
Kenoargentotennantite-(Fe) (tetrahedrite: IMA2020-062) 2.0  [no] [no]
Kenoargentotetrahedrite
Kenoargentotetrahedrite-(Fe) (tetrahedrite: IMA2018-K) 2.0  [no] [no]
Kenoargentotetrahedrite-(Zn) (tetrahedrite: IMA2020-075) 2.0  [no] [no]
Kenoplumbomicrolite (pyrochlore: IMA2015-007a) 4.DH.  [no] [no]
Kenorozhdestvenskayaite-(Fe) (IMA2022-001)
Kenotobermorite (tobermorite: IMA2014 s.p.) 9.DG.  [no] [no]
Kentbrooksite (eudialyte: IMA1996-023) 9.CO.10   [no]
Kentrolite (Y: 1881) 9.BE.80    (IUPAC: dilead dimanganese(III) dioxy(heptaoxodisilicate)
Kenyaite (IMA1967-018) 9.HA.10   
Keplerite (whitlockite: IMA2019-108) 8.0  [no] [no]
Kerimasite (garnet: IMA2009-029) 9.AD.25  [no]  (IUPAC: tricalcium dizirconium tetraoxysilicate di(tetraoxo iron(II)))
Kermesite (Y: 1832) 2.FD.05    (IUPAC: diantimony oxodisulfide)
Kernite (Y: 1927) 6.DB.05   
(Kerolite (saponite, smectite: 1823) 9.E?.  [no] [no])
Kernowite (IMA2020-053) 8.DF.  [no] [no]
Kesebolite-(Ce) (IMA2019-097) 9.0  [no] [no]
Kësterite (stannite: 1958) 2.CB.15a    (IUPAC: dicopper zinc tin tetrasulfide)
Kettnerite (bismutite: 1956) 5.BE.30    (IUPAC: calcium bismuth fluoro oxocarbonate)
Keutschite (stannite: IMA2014-038) 2.0  [no] [no] (IUPAC: dicopper silver arsenide tetrasulfide)
Keyite (alluaudite: IMA1975-002) 8.CA.50    ((☐0.5Cu0.5)CuCdZn2(AsO4)3·H2O)
Keystoneite (zemannite: IMA1987-049) 4.JM.05    (IUPAC: magnesium dinickel diiron(III) hexa(trioxotellurate(IV)) nonahydrate)
Khademite (IMA1973-028 Rd) 7.DB.10    (IUPAC: aluminium fluoro sulfate pentahydrate)
Khaidarkanite (cyanotrichite: IMA1998-013) 3.DA.45   [no] (IUPAC: tetracopper trialuminium tetradecahydroxide trifluoride dihydrate)
Khamrabaevite (carbide, rocksalt: IMA1983-059) 1.BA.20    (IUPAC: titanium carbide bearing vanadium and iron)
Khanneshite (burbankite: IMA1981-025) 5.AC.30   
Kharaelakhite (pentlandite: IMA1983-080) 2.BB.15   
Khatyrkite (khatyrkite: IMA1983-085) 1.AA.15    (IUPAC: copper dialuminium alloy)
Khesinite (sapphirine: IMA2014-033) 9.D?.  [no] [no]
Khibinskite (IMA1973-014) 9.BC.10    (IUPAC: dipotassium zirconium heptaoxodisilicate)
Khinite (tellurium oxysalt: IMA1978-035) 4.FD.30    (IUPAC: tricopper(II) lead dihydro tellurium(VI) hexaoxide)
Khmaralite (sapphirine: IMA1998-027) 9.DH.50   [no]
Khomyakovite (eudialyte: IMA1998-042) 9.CO.10   [no]
Khorixasite (descloizite: IMA2016-048) 8.0  [no] [no]
Khrenovite (alluaudite: IMA2017-105) 8.0  [no] [no] (Na3(Fe3+)2(AsO4)3)
Khristovite-(Ce) (epidote, dollaseite: IMA1991-055) 9.BG.05   [no] (IUPAC: calcium cerium (magnesium aluminium manganese(II)) heptaoxodisilicate tetraoxysilicate fluoride hydroxyl)
Khurayyimite (IMA2018-140) 9.B?.  [no] [no]
Khvorovite (hyalotekite: IMA2014-050) 9.C?.  [no] [no]
Kiddcreekite (IMA1982-106) 2.CB.35a    (IUPAC: hexacopper tungsten tin octasulfide)
Kidwellite (IMA1974-024) 8.DK.20    (IUPAC: sodium nonairon(III) undecahydro hexaphosphate trihydrate)
Kieftite (skutterudite: IMA1991-052) 2.EC.05    (IUPAC: cobalt triantimonide)
Kieserite (kieserite: IMA1967 s.p., 1861) 7.CB.05    (IUPAC: magnesium sulfate monohydrate)
Kihlmanite-(Ce) (tundrite: IMA2012-081) 9.A?.  [no] [no] (IUPAC: dicerium titanium dioxium tetraoxosilicate hydrogencarbonate (water))
Kilchoanite (Y: 1961) 9.BJ.45    (IUPAC: hexacalcium tetraoxysilicate decaoxytrisilicate)
Killalaite (IMA1973-033) 9.BE.85    (Ca6.4[H0.6Si2O7]2(OH)2)
Kimrobinsonite (IMA1983-023) 4.FG.15    (IUPAC: thallium trihydroxide (oxo,carbonate))
Kimuraite-(Y) (tengerite: IMA1984-073) 5.CC.15    (IUPAC: calcium diyttrium tetracarbonate hexahydrate)
Kimzeyite (garnet: IMA1967 s.p., 1961) 9.AD.25   
Kingite (Y: 1957) 8.DC.47    (IUPAC: trialuminium difluoro hydro diphosphate heptahydrate)
Kingsgateite (IMA2019-048) 7.0  [no] [no]
Kingsmountite (calcioferrite: IMA1978-041) 8.DH.25    (IUPAC: tetracalcium iron(II) tetraluminium tetrahydro hexaphosphate dodecahydrate)
Kingstonite (IMA1993-046) 2.DA.25    (IUPAC: trirhodium tetrasulfide)
Kinichilite (zemannite: IMA1979-031) 4.JM.05   
Kinoite (IMA1969-037) 9.BH.10    (IUPAC: dicalcium dicopper decaoxytrisilicate dihydrate)
Kinoshitalite (mica: IMA1973-011) 9.EC.35    (IUPAC: barium trimagnesium (dialuminodecaoxydisilicate) dihydroxyl)
Kintoreite (alunite, crandallite: IMA1992-045) 8.BL.10    (IUPAC: lead triiron(III) hexahydro phosphate hydroxophosphate)
Kipushite (IMA1983-046) 8.DA.35    (IUPAC: hexacopper hexahydro diphosphate monohydrate)
Kircherite (cancrinite: IMA2009-084) 9.FB.05  [no] [no]
Kirchhoffite (zeolitic tectosilicate: IMA2009-094) 9.GB.05  [no]  (IUPAC: caesium bismuth hexaoxydisilicate)
Kirkiite (IMA1984-030) 2.JB.30b    (Pb10Bi3As3S19)
Kirschsteinite (olivine: 1957) 9.AC.05    (IUPAC: calcium iron(II) tetraoxysilicate)
Kiryuite (IMA2021-041) [no] [no] [no]
Kishonite (hydride: IMA2020-023) 1.0  [no] [no] (IUPAC: vanadium dihydride)
Kitagohaite (alloy: IMA2013-114) 1.0  [no]  (IUPAC: heptaplatinum copper alloy)
Kitkaite (IMA1968 s.p., 1965) 2.EA.20    (IUPAC: nickel telluride selenide)
Kittatinnyite (IMA1982-083) 9.AG.35    (IUPAC: dicalcium dimanganese manganese di(tetraoxysilicate) tetrahydroxyl nonahydrate)
KladnoiteH (Y: 1942) 10.CA.25    (IUPAC: phthalimide)
Klajite (IMA2010-004) 8.CE.30  [no] [no] (IUPAC: manganese tetracopper diarsenate dihydroxoarsenate nonahydrate)
Klaprothite (IMA2015-087) 7.0  [no] [no] (IUPAC: hexasodium uranyl tetrasulfate tetrahydrate)
Klebelsbergite (IMA1980 s.p., 1929 Rd) 7.BB.35    (IUPAC: tetraantimony(III) dihydro tetraoxosulfate)
Kleberite (tivanite: IMA2012-023, 1960) 4.CB.25  [no] [no] (IUPAC: iron(III) hexatitanium pentahydro undecaoxide)
Kleemanite (IMA1978-043) 8.DC.17    (IUPAC: zinc dialuminium dihydro diphosphate trihydrate)
Kleinite (Y: 1905) 3.DD.35   
Klöchite (milarite: IMA2007-054) 9.CM.   [no]
Klockmannite (Y: 1928) 2.CA.05b    (Cu5.2Se6)
Klyuchevskite (IMA1987-027) 7.BC.45    (IUPAC: tripotassium tricopper iron(III) dioxotetrasulfate)

Kn – Ko 
Knasibfite (fluorosilicate: IMA2006-042) 3.CH.25    (IUPAC: tripotassium tetrasodium tri(hexafluorosilicate) tetrafluoroborate)
Knorringite (garnet, garnet: IMA1968-010) 9.AD.25    (IUPAC: trimagnesium dichromium tri(tetraoxysilicate))
Koashvite (lovozerite: IMA1973-026) 9.CJ.15c   
Kobeite-(Y) (IMA1987 s.p., 1950) 4.DG.05    Note: might contain Zr as an essential constituent (P. Kartashov).
Kobellite (kobellite: 1841) 2.HB.10a   
Kobokoboite (IMA2009-057) 8.0  [no]  (IUPAC: hexaaluminium hexahydro tetraphosphate undecahydrate)
Kobyashevite (IMA2011-066) 7.0  [no] [no] (IUPAC: pentacopper hexahydro disulfate tetrahydrate)
Kochite (seidozerite, rinkite: IMA2002-012) 9.BE.22   [no] (IUPAC: dicalcium manganese zirconium trisodium di(heptaoxodisilicate) (oxyfluoride) difluoride)
Kochkarite (aleksite: IMA1988-030) 2.GC.40b    (IUPAC: lead tetrabismuth heptatelluride)
Kochsándorite (dundasite: IMA2004-037) 5.DB.10    (IUPAC: calcium dialuminium tetrahydro dicarbonate monohydrate) 
Kodamaite (IMA2018-134) 9.0  [no] [no]
Koechlinite (Y: 1914) 4.DE.15    (IUPAC: dibismuth molybdenum hexaoxide)
Koenenite (Y: 1902) 3.BD.25    (IUPAC: tetrasodium nonamagnesium tetraluminium docosahydro dodecachloride)
Kogarkoite (IMA1970-038) 7.BD.15    (IUPAC: trisodium fluoro sulfate)
Kojonenite (IMA2013-132) 2.0  [no] [no] ( (0.3 ≤ x ≤ 0.8))
Kokchetavite (dmisteinbergite: IMA2004-011) 9.FA.75    (IUPAC: potassium (aluminium octaoxytrisilicate))
Kokinosite (decavanadate: IMA2013-099) 4.0  [no]  (Na2Ca2(V10O28)·24H2O)
Koksharovite (howardevansite: IMA2012-092) 8.0  [no]  (IUPAC: calcium dimagnesium tetrairon(III) hexavanadate)
Koktaite (Y: 1948) 7.CD.35    (IUPAC: diammonium calcium disulfate monohydrate)
Kolarite (IMA1983-081) 3.AA.45    (IUPAC: palladium tellurium dichloride)
Kolbeckite (metavariscite: IMA1987 s.p., 1926) 8.CD.05    (IUPAC: scandium phosphate dihydrate)
KolfaniteQ (arseniosiderite: IMA1981-017) 8.DH.30    (IUPAC: dicalcium triiron(III) dioxotriarsenate dihydrate) Note: possibly arseniosiderite.
Kolicite (IMA1978-076) 8.BE.60    (IUPAC: tetrazinc heptamanganese(II) diarsenate di(tetraoxysilicate) octahydroxyl)
Kolitschite (alunite: IMA2008-063) 8.BM.10  [no] [no]
Kollerite (sulfite: IMA2018-131) 4.0  [no] [no]
KolovratiteQ (Y: 1922) 8.CB.50   
Kolskyite (seidozerite, murmanite: IMA2013-005) 9.B?.  [no] [no] ((Ca,□)Na2Ti4(Si2O7)2O4(H2O)7)
Kolwezite (malachite: IMA1979-017) 5.BA.10    (IUPAC: di(copper,cobalt) dihydro carbonate)
Kolymite (amalgam: IMA1979-046) 1.AD.10    (IUPAC: heptacopper hexamercury amalgam)
Komarovite (IMA1971-011) 9.CE.45   
Kombatite (IMA1985-056) 8.BO.20    (IUPAC: tetradecalead tetrachloro nonaoxodivanadate)
Komkovite (IMA1988-032) 9.DM.10    (IUPAC: barium zirconium nonaoxytrisilicate trihydrate)
Konderite (IMA1983-053) 2.DA.20    (IUPAC: lead tricopper octarhodium hexadecasulfide)
Koninckite (Y: 1883) 8.CE.55    (IUPAC: iron(III) phosphate trihydrate)
Kononovite (titanite: IMA2013-116) 7.0  [no] [no] (IUPAC: sodium magnesium fluoro sulfate)
Konyaite (picromerite: IMA1981-003) 7.CC.80    (IUPAC: disodium magnesium disulfate pentahydrate)
Koragoite (IMA1994-049) 4.DE.10   [no]
Koritnigite (koritnigite: IMA1978-008) 8.CB.20    (IUPAC: zinc hydroxoarsenate monohydrate)
Kornelite (Y: 1888) 7.CB.60    (IUPAC: diron(III) trisulfate heptahydrate(?))
Kornerupine (Y: 1886) 9.BJ.50   
Korobitsynite (labuntsovite: IMA1998-019) 9.CE.30a   [no]
Korshunovskite (IMA1980-083) 3.BD.15    (IUPAC: dimagnesium chloride trihydroxide tetrahydrate)
Koryakite (IMA2018-013) 7.0  [no] [no]
Korzhinskite (IMA1967 s.p., 1963) 6.GA.30    (IUPAC: dicalcium octaoxotetraborate monohydrate)
Kosmochlor (pyroxene: IMA1988 s.p., 1897) 9.DA.25    (IUPAC: sodium chromium hexaoxydisilicate)
Kosnarite (IMA1991-022) 8.AC.60    (IUPAC: potassium dizirconium triphosphate)
Kostovite (calaverite: IMA1965-002) 2.EA.15    (IUPAC: copper gold tetratelluride)
Kostylevite (IMA1982-053) 9.CJ.35    (IUPAC: dipotassium zirconium nonaoxytrisilicate monohydrate)
Kotoite (Y: 1939) 6.AA.35    (IUPAC: trimagnesium di(trioxoborate))
Kottenheimite (ettringite: IMA2011-038) 7.0  [no]  (IUPAC: tricalcium silicium hexahydro disulfate dodecahydrate)
Köttigite (vivianite: 1850) 8.CE.40    (IUPAC: trizinc diarsenate octahydrate)
Kotulskite (nickeline: IMA1967 s.p., 1963) 2.CC.05    ( (x ≈ 0.4))
Koutekite (metalloid alloy: 1958) 2.AA.10d    (IUPAC: pentacopper diarsenide)
Kovdorskite (IMA1979-066) 8.DC.22    (IUPAC: dimagnesium hydro phosphate trihydrate)
Kozłowskiite (kristiansenite: IMA2021-081)
Kozoite (ancylite) 5.DC.05 (IUPAC: REE hydro carbonate)
Kozoite-(La) (IMA2002-054) 5.DC.05   
Kozoite-(Nd) (IMA1998-063) 5.DC.05   [no]
Kozyrevskite (IMA2013-023) 8.0  [no] [no] (IUPAC: tetracopper oxodiarsenate)

Kr – Ky 
Kraisslite (hematolite: IMA1977-003) 8.BE.45   
Krasheninnikovite (IMA2011-044) 7.0  [no] [no] (IUPAC: potassium disodium calcium magnesium trisulfate fluoride)
Krasnoshteinite (IMA2018-077) 6.0  [no] [no]
Krásnoite (IMA2011-040) 8.DO.20  [no] [no]
Krasnovite (IMA1991-020) 8.DK.35   
Kratochvílite (Y: 1938) 10.BA.25    (IUPAC: It is uncertain whether it is fluorene (C13H10) or anthracene (C14H10))
Krausite (Y: 1931) 7.CC.05    (IUPAC: potassium iron(III) disulfate monohydrate)
Krauskopfite (IMA1964-008) 9.DH.30    (IUPAC: barium pentaoxydisilicate trihydrate)
Krautite (koritnigite: IMA1974-028) 8.CB.15    (IUPAC: manganese hydroxoarsenate monohydrate)
Kravtsovite (IMA2016-092) 2.0  [no] [no] (IUPAC: palladium disilver sulfide)
Kreiterite (IMA2019-041) 9.0  [no] [no]
Kremersite (Y: 1853) 3.CJ.10    (IUPAC: diammonium iron(III) pentachloride monohydrate)
Krennerite (calaverite: 1878) 2.EA.15    (IUPAC: trigold silver octatelluride)
Krettnichite (tsumcorite: IMA1998-044) 8.CG.15    (IUPAC: lead dimanganese(III) dihydro divanadate)
Kribergite (Y: 1945) 8.DC.52    (IUPAC: pentaluminium tetrahydro triphosphate sulfate tetrahydrate)
Krieselite (topaz: IMA2000-043a) 9.AF.20    (IUPAC: dialuminium tetraoxogermanate dihydroxyl)
Krinovite (sapphirine: IMA1967-016) 9.DH.40   
Kristiansenite (kristiansenite: IMA2000-051) 9.BC.30   [no] (IUPAC: dicalcium scandium tin heptaoxodisilicate hydroxyhexaoxydisilicate)
Krivovichevite (IMA2004-053) 7.BC.75    (IUPAC: trilead aluminium hexahydroxide hydro sulfate)
Kröhnkite (Y: 1879) 7.CC.30    (IUPAC: disodium copper disulfate dihydrate)
Krotite (beryllonite: IMA2010-038) 4.BC.  [no] [no] (IUPAC: calcium dialuminium tetraoxide)
Kroupaite (IMA2017-031) 4.GA.  [no] [no] (IUPAC: dipotassium lead [hexadecauranyl icosahydro octaoxide] icosahydrate)
Kruijenite (IMA2018-057) 8.0  [no] [no] (IUPAC: tetracalctetralumium difluoro hexadecahydro sulfate dihydrate)
Krupkaite (meneghinite: IMA1974-020) 2.HB.05a    (PbCuBi3S6)
Krut'aite (pyrite: IMA1972-001) 2.EB.05a    (IUPAC: copper diselenide)
Krutovite (pyrite: IMA1975-009) 2.EB.25    (IUPAC: nickel diarsenide)
Kryachkoite (alloy: IMA2016-062) 1.0  [no] [no]
Kryzhanovskite (reddingite: 1950) 8.CC.05   
Ktenasite (ktenasite: 1950) 7.DD.20    Note: probably a mineral group.
Kuannersuite-(Ce) (apatite: IMA2002-013) 8.BN.05    (IUPAC: disodium dicerium hexabarium fluoro chloro hexaphosphate)
Kudriavite (IMA2003-011) 2.JA.05c   
Kudryavtsevaite (IMA2012-078) 4.0  [no] [no] (IUPAC: trisodium magnesium iron(III) tetratitanium dodecaoxide)
Kufahrite (alloy: IMA2020-045)  [no] [no] (IUPAC: platinum lead alloy)
Kukharenkoite 5.BD.10 (IUPAC: dibarium REE fluoro tricarbonate)
Kukharenkoite-(Ce) (IMA1995-040) 5.BD.10   
Kukharenkoite-(La) (IMA2002-019) 5.BD.10   
Kukisvumite (IMA1989-052) 9.DB.20    (IUPAC: hexasodium zinc tetratitanium tetraoxy octa(trioxysilicate) tetrahydrate)
Kuksite (dugganite: IMA1989-018) 8.DL.20    (IUPAC: trilead trizinc hexaoxo tellurium(VI) diphosphate)
Kulanite (bjarebyite: IMA1975-012) 8.BH.20    (IUPAC: barium diiron(II) dialuminium trihydro triphosphate)
Kuliginite (IMA2016-049) 3.0  (IUPAC: triiron magnesium hexahydroxide dichloride)
Kuliokite-(Y) (IMA1984-064) 9.AG.50    (IUPAC: tetrayttrium aluminium di(tetraoxysilicate) dihydroxyl pentafluoride)
Kulkeite (corrensite: IMA1980-031) 9.EC.60    A 1:1 regular interstratification of a trioctahedral chlorite and talc.
Kullerudite (marcasite: IMA1967 s.p., 1964) 2.EB.10a    (IUPAC: nickel diselenide)
Kumdykolite (feldspar: IMA2007-049) 9.FA.45    (IUPAC: sodium (aluminium octaoxytrisilicate))
Kummerite (laueite, laueite: IMA2015-036) 8.0  [no] [no] (IUPAC: manganese(II) iron(III) aluminium dihydro diphosphate octahydrate)
Kumtyubeite (humite: IMA2008-045) 9.AF.45   [no] (IUPAC: pentacalcium di(tetraoxysilicate) difluoride)
Kunatite (arthurite: IMA2007-057) 8.DC.15   [no] (IUPAC: copper diiron(III) dihydro diphosphate tetrahydrate)
Kupčíkite (cuprobismutite: IMA2001-017) 2.JA.10b    (Cu3.4Fe0.6Bi5S10)
Kupletskite (astrophyllite, kupletskite) 9.DC.05
Kupletskite (Y: 1956) 9.DC.05   
Kupletskite-(Cs) (IMA1970-009) 9.DC.05   
Kuramite (stannite: IMA1979-013) 2.CB.15a    (IUPAC: tricopper tin tetrasulfide)
Kuranakhite (tellurium oxysalt: IMA1974-030) 4.DM.25    (IUPAC: lead manganese(IV) tellurium(VI) hexaoxide)
Kuratite (sapphirine: IMA2013-109) 9.D  [no] [no]
Kurchatovite (IMA1965-034) 6.BA.10    (IUPAC: calcium magnesium pentaoxodiborate)
Kurgantaite (hilgardite: IMA2000-B, 1952) 6.ED.05    (IUPAC: calcium strontium chloro nonaoxopentaborate monohydrate)
Kurilite (IMA2009-080) 2.0    (IUPAC: octasilver tritelluride selenide)
Kurnakovite (Y: 1940) 6.CA.20    (IUPAC: magnesium pentahydro trioxotriborate pentahydrate)
KurumsakiteQ (montmorillonite, smectite: 1954) 9.EC.40   
Kusachiite (trippkeite: IMA1992-024) 4.JA.20    (IUPAC: copper(II) dibismuth(III) tetraoxide)
Kushiroite (pyroxene: IMA2008-059) 9.DA.15   [no] (IUPAC: calcium aluminium aluminohexaoxysilicate)
Kutinaite (metalloid alloy: IMA1969-034) 2.AA.25    (IUPAC: hexasilver tetradecacopper heptarsenide)
Kutnohorite (dolomite: 1903) 5.AB.10    (IUPAC: calcium manganese(II) dicarbonate)
Kuvaevite (IMA2020-043) 2.0  [no] [no]
Kuzelite (hydrotalcite: IMA1996-053) 4.FL.15    (IUPAC: tetracalcium dialuminium dodecahydroxide sulfate hexahydrate)
Kuzmenkoite (labuntsovite) 9.CE.30c
Kuzmenkoite-Mn (IMA1998-058) 9.CE.30c   [no]
Kuzmenkoite-Zn (IMA2001-037) 9.CE.30c   [no]
Kuzminite (IMA1986-005) 3.AA.30    (IUPAC: dimercury di(bromide,chloride))
Kuznetsovite (IMA1980-009) 8.BO.35    (IUPAC: (dimercury) mercury(II) arsenate chloride)
Kvanefjeldite (IMA1982-079) 9.DP.30   
Kyanite (IMA1967 s.p., 1789) 9.AF.15    (IUPAC: dialuminium oxo(tetraoxysilicate))
Kyanoxalite (cancrinite: IMA2008-041) 9.FB.05   [no]
Kyawthuite (IMA2015-078) 4.0  [no] [no] (IUPAC: bismuth(III) antimony(V) tetraoxide)
Kyrgyzstanite (chalcoalumite: IMA2004-024) 7.DD.75   [no] (IUPAC: zinc tetraluminium dodecahydro sulfate trihydrate)
Kyzylkumite (IMA1980-081) 4.CB.75    (IUPAC: dititanium vanadium(III) hydro pentaoxide)

External links
IMA Database of Mineral Properties/ RRUFF Project
Mindat.org - The Mineral Database
Webmineral.com
Mineralatlas.eu minerals K and L